Martin Harcourt Chivers (born 27 April 1945) is an English retired professional footballer from the 1960s and 1970s.

Playing career

Southampton
Chivers attended Taunton's Grammar School, Southampton, and wrote to his local club, Southampton for a trial. He spent a brief period in the club's nursery side, CPC Sports, and signed as a professional footballer in September 1962, making his debut against Charlton Athletic on 8 September 1962 (aged 17). He failed to score on his debut and his first goal came in a 4–1 defeat by Newcastle United on 6 April 1963 (in his third first-team appearance).

In the 1963–64 season, he became a regular starter and was the club's joint leading goalscorer (with Terry Paine) with 21 goals, as Southampton finished a disappointing fifth in Division 2. The following season, he was again a virtual ever-present, making 39 appearances with 17 goals as the Saints improved to fourth place.

In the 1965–66 season, he played an integral role as the club finally gained promotion to the top flight (as runners-up), scoring 30 goals from 39 games, generally from crosses provided by Terry Paine and John Sydenham. All his goals were scored from the first 29 games, and he failed to find the net after the end of February.

Once in the First Division, he played second fiddle to the Welsh striker, Ron Davies, scoring 14 and 13 goals respectively in the next two seasons. He became unsettled at The Dell and was soon being chased by many of the top clubs. Saints' manager Ted Bates was prepared to allow Chivers to leave, as he had a more than adequate replacement coming up through the ranks in Mick Channon.

In January 1968, Tottenham Hotspur manager Bill Nicholson signed Chivers for a club record fee of £125,000, which also made him the country's most expensive player at that time. The deal involved 24-year-old Frank Saul moving from White Hart Lane to The Dell.

Whilst at Southampton he had won 12 England Under-23 caps. He scored a total of 106 goals in 190 appearances for The Saints. His name is also in the record books as the first substitute to score for The Saints, in a 3–1 defeat by Newcastle United on 29 April 1967.

Tottenham Hotspur

Chivers scored on his Spurs debut against Sheffield Wednesday in January 1968, but the initial stages of his White Hart Lane career were relatively unsuccessful, with Spurs legends Jimmy Greaves and Alan Gilzean still preferred as an attacking partnership. Chivers remained a fixture of the England Under-23 squad and eventually became the most important goalscorer at Tottenham, following the sale of Greaves to West Ham United in 1970.

Chivers was often seen as a lethargic and lazy player, but his pace and natural strength established 'Big Chiv' as a star of the Spurs side and England throughout the early 1970s. The 1970–71 season was the beginning of Martin Chivers' golden years, for both club and country. He played in all 58 competitive games and scored 34 times, including both goals in the League Cup final against Aston Villa, and 21 goals in the First Division as Spurs finished the season in third place. Chivers also scored his first senior goal for England a 3–0 win over Greece in April 1971.

During the 1971–72 campaign, Chivers hit the best form of his career, netting 44 times in 64 first team appearances. His seven goals in as many League Cup ties enabled Spurs to reach the semi-finals of the competition where they eventually lost to London neighbours Chelsea. The resurgent striker saved his most impressive form for the UEFA Cup, scoring eight times in 11 matches, including a hat-trick in a 9–0 demolition of Icelandic side Keflavik ÍF, and a superb double against Wolverhampton Wanderers in a memorable final. In the First Division, he surpassed his tally of the previous campaign, scoring 25 times in 39 appearances.

Chivers continued his prolific form in the 1972–73 season, finding the net 33 times in 61 appearances. His acclaimed goalscoring ability again guided Tottenham to League Cup success with two quarter-final strikes against Liverpool, and a crucial goal at Molineux where the Londoners drew 2–2 to reach the final. His European form was equally impressive, producing eight goals in ten matches, as Spurs reached the UEFA Cup semi-finals before losing to Liverpool on the away goals rule. In October 1973, Chivers won the last of his full England caps against Poland in an infamous World Cup qualifier. Despite scoring six international goals in the calendar year, the Spurs striker was a casualty of his country's failure to qualify for the tournament and would later be ignored by caretaker manager Joe Mercer and future boss Don Revie.

Spurs again reached the final of the UEFA Cup in 1974 with Chivers scoring six goals, including the opener in a 2–0 home victory against East German side Lokomotive Leipzig. The two-legged final was to end in disappointment with Dutch giants Feyenoord winning 4–2 on aggregate as Spurs lost a major final for the first time. By the beginning of the 1974–75 season, Chivers was considered to be the senior forward at Tottenham, playing alongside Chris Jones, Chris McGrath and Scotsman John Duncan. In early September, he played his last game for the legendary Bill Nicholson, as Middlesbrough crushed Spurs 4–0 in the 2nd round of the League Cup. Injuries restricted Chivers to just 28 league appearances in which he scored 10 goals, including important strikes against West Ham United, Leeds United and local rivals Arsenal.

The 1975–76 season was Chivers' last at White Hart Lane as he struggled to find the net in a relatively poor Spurs team. He made 37 appearances in all competitions, scoring nine times, before joining Swiss club Servette for an £80,000 fee. In his -year Spurs career, Chivers scored a total of 174 goals in 367 first-team appearances and remained the leading Tottenham goalscorer in European competition for 39 years until he was overtaken by Jermain Defoe on 7 November 2013. He was capped 24 times for England, scoring 13 goals.

Later career
At the age of 31 in July 1976, the prolific striker moved to Servette in Switzerland, before returning to English league football with spells at Norwich City (1978–79) and Brighton (1979–80), where he finished his career.

Martin Chivers was appointed the National Development Manager to the FA in May 2008.

After football
After retiring from professional football, he managed clubs in England and Norway and owned a hotel and restaurant in Hertfordshire. Chivers has commentated for BBC Radio and remains a popular matchday host at White Hart Lane.

In April 2007, he was the most recent inductee to the Tottenham Hotspur Hall of Fame.

Chivers' autobiography, "Big Chiv - My Goals in Life", was released in October 2009.

Honours
Southampton
 Football League Division 2: runner-up 1965–66

Tottenham Hotspur
 League Cup: 1970–71, 1972–73
 UEFA Cup: 1971–72

Servette
 Swiss Cup: 1977–78
 Swiss League Cup: 1976–77
 Coppa delle Alpi: 1975–76

Individual
 Swiss League Best Foreign Player: 1977–78

References

Bibliography

External links

Living people
1945 births
Footballers from Southampton
Association football forwards
English footballers
English expatriate footballers
England international footballers
England under-23 international footballers
Southampton F.C. players
Tottenham Hotspur F.C. players
Servette FC players
Norwich City F.C. players
Brighton & Hove Albion F.C. players
SK Vard Haugesund players
Barnet F.C. players
Frankston Pines F.C. players
Dorchester Town F.C. players
English Football League players
English Football League representative players
Expatriate footballers in Switzerland
Expatriate footballers in Norway
UEFA Cup winning players
English expatriate sportspeople in Switzerland
English expatriate sportspeople in Norway